1952–53 was the seventh season of the Western International Hockey League.

Standings
 Spokane Flyers	        32-34-2	.568	284-257
 Trail Smoke Eaters	26-22-1	.541	246-219
 Nelson Maple Leafs	23-22-2	.511	210-212
 Kimberley Dynamiters	13-26-4	.349	177-229

Semi finals
Best of 5

 Spokane 4 Nelson 1
 Nelson 6 Spokane 1
 Nelson 3 Spokane 1
 Spokane 5 Nelson 3
 Spokane 5 Nelson 3

Spokane Flyers beat Nelson Maple Leafs 3 wins to 2.

 Trail 6 Kimberley 2
 Trail 7 Kimberley 4
 Kimberley 7 Trail 5
 Kimberley 8 Trail 2
 Trail 6 Kimberley 2

Trail Smoke Eaters beat Kimberley Dynamiters 3 wins to 2.

Final
Best of 5

 Spokane 4 Trail 2
 Spokane 6 Trail 3
 Trail 4 Spokane 2
 Spokane 2 Trail 0

Spokane Flyers beat Trail Smoke Eaters 3 wins to 1.

Spokane Flyers advanced to the 1952-53 British Columbia Senior Playoffs.

References 

Western International Hockey League seasons
Wihl Season, 1952–53
Wihl Season, 1952–53